Moonnam Pakkam is a 1988 Indian Malayalam-language sentimental drama film written and directed by Padmarajan. It stars Thilakan and Jayaram in the lead roles along with Kirti Singh, Jagathi Sreekumar, Rahman, Ashokan and Ajayan in supporting roles. Kirti and Ajayan made their debut in this film. The film was  a commercial success. Thilakan's performance in the film considered one of his most memorable performances.

Plot
Thampi, who retired as an accountant from Indian Railway in mid-1980s following his son's death leads a solitary life in his ancestral house. Thampi's grandson Bhasker  Pachu had completed his medicine studies from Bangalore. Thampi is excited when his grandson Pachu, comes along with his friends - Lopez, Renjith Menon and Krishnankutty to spend his vacation with grandpa. Their presence brings joy and happiness into Thampi's house. Pachu is engaged to a girl, Bhadra who happened to be the granddaughter of Thampi's friend. During the vacation Pachu and his friends often go to the nearby beach for a swim. During one such visit Pachu and Lopez gets pulled into the ocean and only Lopez manages to escape. The Police and the locals conduct a rescue operation in the ocean but in vain. It is believed among the locals that whatever that is taken by the ocean is returned on the third day (as meant by the title of the movie). Thampi refuses to acknowledge the fact that Pachu is dead and puts on a brave face, consoling Pachu's mother, his friends and Bhadra. Eventually the body is found on the third day. The funeral is held on the same day and Pachu's friends get ready to leave the day after. They all visit the beach one last time to say goodbye to Pachu where they see Thampi arriving with priests to perform the funeral rites of Pachu. While performing the "bali", Thampi, who lost all hope, takes the rice ball/"balichoru" in his hands proceeds to the sea. To everyone's shock Thampi, along with the "balichoru" submits himself to the sea and commits suicide.

Cast
Thilakan as Thampi / Karnavar
Jayaram as Bhasker / Bhasi / Pachu
Kirti Singh as Bhadra
Rahman as Lopaz
Ashokan as Ranjith
Ajayan as Krishnankutty
Jagathi Sreekumar as Kavala
Jayabharathi as Bhanu (Pachu's mother)
Venu Nagavally as Jayan (Pachu's father)
Soman as Kurup

Crew
Story, screenplay, dialogue and direction - P. Padmarajan
Producer - Balan
Banner and distributor - Gandhimathi Films
Cinematography - Venu
Editor - B. Lenin
Art - Kurian Sabarigiri
Stills - Surya Jones
Make-up - Mohandas
Costume design - Indrans
Music - Ilaiyaraaja
Lyrics - Sreekumaran Thampi

Production
Major parts of the film were shot in Kanyakumari and surrounding places. The locales include Colachel (where the ancestral house is set) and Vatta Kottai (where the fort scene and the song "Thamarakkili" were picturised).

Soundtrack 

G. Venugopal won the Kerala State Film Award for Best Singer for the song "Unarumee Gaanam".

Reception 
In 2019, Aradhya Kurup of The News Minute wrote, " It’s a breezy watch till a few scenes before climax. But after that you witness one of the most traumatic climax scenes in Malayalam cinema. And Thilakan’s performance is such that you go through the whole rollercoaster ride with him." The New Indian Express wrote, "A youthful Jayaram and versatile Thilakan produce a unforgettable display of love and affection between a widower and his grandchild. Thilakan's Thampi is as good as his Kochuvava from Kattukuthira (1990) or Achuthan Nair from Kireedam (1989) and Chenkol (1993), establishing his contendership for the best actor ever in Malayalam."

References

External links 
 
More about the film

1988 films
1980s Malayalam-language films
1988 drama films
Films with screenplays by Padmarajan
Films directed by Padmarajan
Films scored by Ilaiyaraaja